University House may refer to:
University House (Auckland), New Zealand
University House, Australian National University
University House, Berkeley
University House, Newcastle, New South Wales
University House, University of Birmingham
University House, University of Sheffield
University House, University of East London
University House, University of Lancaster